Carmel School, Kuwait is a private catholic school of all religious denominations in Kuwait. The school was established in 1969 by the Sisters of the Apostolic Carmel, who have several educational establishments across the Middle East, Africa and Asia. The school was first established in Salwa and later shifted to Khaitan. It is managed by the nuns of the Apostolic Carmel.

Certificates 
The school is recognized by the Ministry of Education, Kuwait and affiliated to the National Council of Educational Research and Training, New Delhi. It is governed by the Registered Society of the Congregation of the Apostolic Carmel, India. The school prepares students for the All India Secondary School Examination (Class X) and the All India Senior Secondary Certificate Examination (Class XII).

Language 
Lessons are conducted in English; Hindi is the compulsory second language till the fourth grade, after which French is offered as an option. Arabic is taught as a third language to 1st graders till the 8th grade.

References

External links 

 Official website

Private schools in Kuwait
Indian international schools in Kuwait
Carmelite educational institutions
Educational institutions established in 1969
1969 establishments in Kuwait